The Men's slalom competition at the FIS Alpine World Ski Championships 2023 was held at L'Éclipse ski course in Courchevel on 18 and 19 February 2023.

Results

Final
The first run was started on 19 February at 10:00 and the second run at 13:30.

Qualification
The qualification was held on 18 February at 10:00 and 13:30.

References

Men's slalom